Jagdish Bhola is a former sportsperson and allegedly a drug smuggler. He was well known as "king kong" of Indian wrestling and had earned Arjuna Award during his wrestling career.

Early life 
Jagdish Bhola was born in Chauke (dist. Bathinda). Bhola spent most of his childhood with his maternal family. At an early age he was encouraged by his maternal uncle to take up wrestling as a career and was trained by him as well in village Chauke itself, where many national and international players have been produced. Later on Bhola shifted to Ludhiana and joined a renowned akhara to master his skills in wrestling.

Career 
As a wrestler he reached fame after earning a silver medal in the 1991 Asian Wrestling Championships, Delhi, he also competed throughout the world. For his wrestling career, Government awarded him with the Arjuna Award.  
Bhola also appeared in a Punjabi language movie, Rustam-e-Hind which released in 2008. For a brief time Bhola served in the Punjab police as DSP before being suspended by the Punjab Police.

Decline in career 
Bhola was subject to controversy when in 2008 he was caught by Mumbai Police for drug peddling. Soon after the government took away his Arjuna award, followed by Punjab police suspending Bhola from his DSP post in 2002.

Bhola restarted his drug trafficking business earning much wealth and possessing two posh bungalows, costly cars and having a sugar mill fitted with high resolution CCTV cameras around its perimeter.

He was arrested again in 2015 by Punjab Police along with Ram Singh, a boxer, for alleged participation in synthetic drug cartel of  700 crore.

According to sources, Bhola was also convicted for running illegal drug manufacturing business from his home. According to Punjab Police he is the head of the Punjab-based drug racket. The drugs where trafficked from Pakistani border areas and is supplied to Mumbai and parts of Himachal Pradesh.

References 

Indian wrestlers
Indian male martial artists
Living people
Year of birth missing (living people)
Recipients of the Arjuna Award